Carlos Valentín José de la Soledad Antonio del Sacramento de Soublette y Jerez de Aristeguieta (15 December 1789 – 11 February 1870) was the president of Venezuela from 1837 to 1839 and 1843 to 1847 and a hero of the Venezuelan War of Independence.

Personal life
Soublette was married to Olalla Buroz y Tovar, who served as First Lady of Venezuela from 1837 to 1839 and 1843 to 1847.

See also
List of Ministers of Foreign Affairs of Venezuela 
List of presidents of Venezuela

References

External links

 

People from La Guaira
Presidents of Venezuela
Vice presidents of Venezuela
Venezuelan Ministers of Foreign Affairs
People of the Venezuelan War of Independence
Venezuelan soldiers
1789 births
1870 deaths
Venezuelan people of Canarian descent
Conservative Party (Venezuela) politicians
Secretaries of War and Navy of Colombia
Burials at the National Pantheon of Venezuela